Terran Federation may refer to:
 Terran Federation (Starship Troopers)
 Terran Federation (Blake's 7)
 Terran Federation (Starfire)

See also
 Terran Confederation (Wing Commander)
 Terran Confederacy (StarCraft)
 Earth Federation (Gundam)
 United Earth Federation (Supreme Commander)
 Galaxy Federation (Xenosaga)
 United Federation of Planets (Star Trek)
 Terro-Human Future History in works by H. Beam Piper